ZMS may refer to:
 Zegham Medical Services Private Limited deals in ZMS Health Cards
 ZMS, a series of processors manufactured by ZiiLABS
 ZMS, a messaging system used by the mobile app Lango
 ZOS Messaging Service, a protocol for exchanging geo coordinates